The russet free-tailed bat (Chaerephon russatus) is a species of bat in the family Molossidae. It is found in Cameroon, Democratic Republic of the Congo, Ghana, and Kenya. Its natural habitat is subtropical or tropical moist lowland forests.

References

Chaerephon (bat)
Bats of Africa
Bat, Russet free-tailed
Bat, Russet free-tailed
Near threatened biota of Africa
Mammals described in 1917
Taxa named by Joel Asaph Allen
Taxonomy articles created by Polbot